Fencing events were contested at the 2001 Summer Universiade were held in Beijing, People's Republic of China.

Medal overview

Men's events

Women's events

Medal table

References
Official 2001 Universiade website
Universiade fencing medalists on HickokSports

2001 Summer Universiade
Universiade
Fencing at the Summer Universiade
International fencing competitions hosted by China